Mark Robson may refer to:

 Mark Robson (film director) (1913–1978), Canadian film director and producer
 Mark Robson (American writer), Scottish-American writer and expert in United States coins and stamps
 Mark Robson (footballer) (born 1969), English football player and coach